Gordon Harvey Winton Jr. (August 21, 1913 – March 3, 1997) served in the California State Assembly for the 31st district from 1957 to 1967. During World War II he served in the United States Navy.

References

United States Navy personnel of World War I
1913 births
Republican Party members of the California State Assembly
1997 deaths